Lakeview is an unincorporated community in Moore County, North Carolina, United States. Lakeview has a post office with ZIP code 28350.

The Lakeview Historic District was added to the National Register of Historic Places in 2000.

References

Unincorporated communities in Moore County, North Carolina
Unincorporated communities in North Carolina